You Should Be Here is the second studio album by American country music artist Cole Swindell. It was released on May 6, 2016 via Warner Bros. Nashville. The lead single, its title track, was released to radio on December 14, 2015. The song became Swindell's fourth number-one hit after it reached the top of both the Hot Country Songs and Country Airplay charts of Billboard magazine. The track listing was announced on April 4. The track "Flatliner" peaked at number two on US Country Airplay in 2017. "Flatliner" also hit number one on Mediabase country radio singles chart and was most played and heard August 6–12 receiving ~8,302 spins (+600) and ~52.136 million audience impressions.

Commercial performance
You Should Be Here debuted at number two on Billboards Top Country Albums chart, selling 65,500 copies in its first week. It also debuted at number six on US Billboard 200 chart. On February 21, 2017, the album was certified gold for combined sales and album-equivalent units of over 500,000 units. As of June 2018, the album has sold 318,000 copies in the United States.

Track listing

Personnel
Adapted from AllMusic

Dierks Bentley - featured vocals on "Flatliner" (uncredited)
Pat Buchanan - electric guitar
Michael Carter - electric guitar, keyboards, piano, programming, synthesizer
Dave Cohen - Hammond B-3 organ, keyboards, piano, synthesizer
James Mitchell - electric guitar
Greg Morrow - drums, percussion
John Palmieri - percussion, background vocals
Billy Panda - acoustic guitar
Cole Swindell - lead vocals
Russell Terrell - background vocals
Patrick Thrasher - programming
Mike Wolofsky - bass guitar

Charts

Weekly charts

Year-end charts

Singles

Certifications

References 

2016 albums
Cole Swindell albums
Warner Records albums